"Love You Like Mad" is the debut single of English R&B group VS and the first from their debut studio album, All Kinds of Trouble (2004). The song was produced by Norwegian production team Stargate and co-wrote with band members Jaime Douglas and Tyran Graham. It was released on 23 February 2004 via Virgin and Innocent Records. "Love You Like Mad" peaked at number seven on the UK Singles Chart and remains their most successful single to date.

Track listings
UK CD single
 "Love You Like Mad"  
 "Love You Like Mad" (Bon Garcon Remix)

Charts

Weekly charts

Year-end charts

References

2004 debut singles
2004 songs
Innocent Records singles
Song recordings produced by Stargate (record producers)
Songs written by Hallgeir Rustan
Songs written by Mikkel Storleer Eriksen
Songs written by Tor Erik Hermansen
Virgin Records singles